Jason Eade is an Australian former professional rugby league footballer who played in the 1990s. He played for Western Suburbs and the Western Reds in the NSWRL/ARL competition and for Paris Saint-Germain in the Super League.

Playing career
Eade made his first grade debut in round 3 of the 1994 NSWRL season against Manly-Warringah at Brookvale Oval. Eade played off the bench in a 66-8 loss. Eade joined the newly admitted Western Reds ahead of the 1995 ARL season and was an inaugural squad member at the club. After one further season with the Perth based club, Eade joined Super League side Paris Saint-Germain. He played a total of nine games for the French club in the 1997 Super League season. After the completion of the season, Paris Saint-Germain were liquidated and Eade never played first grade rugby league again.

References

1972 births
Western Suburbs Magpies players
Western Reds players
Paris Saint-Germain Rugby League players
Australian rugby league players
Rugby league wingers
Rugby league centres
Living people